Jim Relle (born 10 June 1961) is a Canadian rower. He competed in the men's coxless pair event at the 1984 Summer Olympics.

References

External links
 

1961 births
Living people
Canadian male rowers
Olympic rowers of Canada
Rowers at the 1984 Summer Olympics
Rowers from Toronto